The 20th Busan International Film Festival was held from October 1 to October 10, 2015 at South Korea's Busan Cinema Center and was hosted by Song Kang-ho and Marina Golbahari.

In this year's festival, a total of 302 films from 75 countries was screened, with 94 serving as world premieres and 31 serving as international premieres.

The 302 films, which includes films from countries such as Japan, India, the Philippines, Thailand, Indonesia and Iran, were played on 35 screens at six theaters in Busan, including Busan Cinema Center, CGV Centum City, Lotte Cinema Centum City, Dongseo University Sohyang Theater, Megabox Haeundae and Megabox Busan Theater.

Program

Opening 
Zubaan - Mozez Singh (India)

Gala Presentation 
A Bigger Splash - Luca Guadagnino (Italy)
Color of Asia - Masters - Wang Xiaoshuai, Im Sang-soo, Naomi Kawase, Apichatpong Weerasethakul (China/Korea/Japan/Thailand)
Mountains May Depart - Jia Zhangke (China/Japan/France)
Our Little Sister - Hirokazu Koreeda (Japan)
The Assassin - Hou Hsiao-hsien (Taiwan/China/Hong Kong, China/France)
Un plus une - Claude Lelouch (France)

A Window on Asian Cinema 
3000 Nights - Mai Masri (Palestine/France/Jordan/Lebanon/United Arab Emirates/Qatar)
3688 - Royston Tan (Singapore )
7 Letters - Royston Tan, Tan Pin Pin, Boo Junfeng, Kelvin Tong, Eric Khoo, Jack Neo, K. Rajagopal (Singapore)
A Copy of My Mind - Joko Anwar (Indonesia)
A Flag without a Country - Bahman Ghobadi (Iraq)
A Tale of Three Cities - Mabel Cheung (China)
Afternoon - Tsai Ming-liang (Taiwan)
Aligarh - Hansal Mehta (India)
Avalanche - Morteza Farshbaf (Iran)
Bad Guys Always Die - Sun Hao (China/Korea)
Being Good - Mipo O (Japan)
Big Father, Small Father and Other Stories - Phan Dang Di (Vietnam/France/Germany/Netherlands)
Blanka - Hasei Kohki (Italy/Philippines/Japan)
Cemetery of Splendour - Apichatpong Weerasethakul (Thailand/United Kingdom/France/Germany/Malaysia/Korea/Mexico/United States/Norway)
Chaotic Love Poems - Garin Nugroho (Indonesia)
Dark in the White Light - Vimukthi Jayasundara (Sri Lanka/France)
Ever Since We Love - Li Yu (China)
Farewell, Berlin Wall - Nguyen Phan Quang Binh (Vietnam/Germany)
Guilty - Meghna Gulzar (India)
In the Room - Eric Khoo (Hong Kong, China/Singapore)
Journey to the Shore - Kiyoshi Kurosawa (Japan/France)
Kothanodi - Bhaskar Hazarika (India)
Leopard Do Not Bite - Prasanna Jayakody (Sri Lanka)
Looking for Rohmer - Wang Chao (China/France)
Masaan - Neeraj Ghaywan (India/France)
Mother - Jami Mahmood (Pakistan/United States)
Murmur of the Hearts - Sylvia Chang (Taiwan/Hong Kong, China)
Nahid - Ida Panahandeh (Iran)
O Kadhal Kanmani - Mani Ratnam (India)
Office - Johnnie To (China/Hong Kong, China)
Orange Candy - Biju Viswanath (India)
Paradise - Sina Dena Ataeian (Iran/Germany)
Paths of the Soul - Zhang Yang (China)
Peace Haven - Suman Ghosh (India)
Pink and Gray - Isao Yukisada (Japan)
Sentence Me Guilty - Sun Liang (China)
Taklub - Brillante Mendoza (Philippines)
Taxi - Jafar Panahi (Iran)
Tharlo - Pema Tseden (China)
The Black Hen - Min Bahadur Bham (Nepal/France/Germany)
The Idol - Hany Abu-Assad (United Kingdom/Palestine/Qatar/Netherlands/United Arab Emirates)
The Long Farewell - Farzad Motamen (Iran)
The Mad King of Taipei - Nelson Yeh (Taiwan)
The Man Who Became a Horse - Amir Hossein Saghafi (Iran)
The Sea and the Flying Fish - Mehrdad Ghafarzadeh (Iran)
The Virgin Psychics - Sion Sono (Japan)
Three Stories of Love - Ryōsuke Hashiguchi (Japan)
Toll Bar - Zhassulan Poshanov (Kazakhstan)
Underground Fragrance - Pengfei (France/China)
Undertone - Li Ruiqi (China)
Zinnia Flower - Lin Shu-yu (Taiwan)

New Currents 
Black Horse Memories - Shahram Alidi (Iran/Turkey)
Communication & Lies - Lee Seung-won (Korea)
Go Home - Jihane Chouaib (France/Switzerland/Belgium/Lebanon)
Immortal - Seyed Hadi Mohaghegh (Iran)
Night and Fog in Zona - Jung Sung-il (Korea)
Radio Set - Hari Viswanath (India)
Walnut Tree - Yerlan Nurmukhambetov (Kazakhstan)
West North West - Nakamura Takuro (Japan)

Korean Cinema Today - Panorama 
Fourth Place - Jung Ji-woo (Korea)
A Break Alone - Cho Jae-hyun (Korea)
A Korean in Paris - Jeon Soo-il (Korea/France)
Assassination - Choi Dong-hoon (Korea)
Circle of Atonement - Park Eun-gyoung, Lee Dong-ha (Korea)
Love and... - Zhang Lu (Korea)
Madonna - Shin Su-won (Korea)
Ode to My Father - Yoon Je-kyoon (Korea)
Office - Hong Won-chan (Korea)
One Way Trip - Choi Jeong-yeol (Korea)
Ordinary People - Kim Byung-June (Korea)
Proj. Get-up-and-go - Lee Keun-woo (Korea)
Right Now, Wrong Then - Hong Sang-soo (Korea)
STOP - Kim Ki-duk - (Korea)
The Classified File - Kwak Kyung-taek (Korea)
The Piper - Kim Gwang-tae (Korea)
The Royal Tailor - Lee Won-suk (Korea)
The Shameless - Oh Seung-uk (Korea)
The Silenced - Lee Hae-young (Korea)
Twenty - Lee Byeong-heon (Korea)
The Unfair - Kim Sung-je (Korea)
Twenty Again - Park Heung-sik (Korea)
Two Rooms, Two Nights - David Cho (Korea)
Veteran - Ryoo Seung-wan (Korea)

Korean Cinema Today - Vision 
ALONE - Park Hong-min (Korea)
Another Night - Choi Yong-suk (Korea)
Another Way - Cho Chang-ho (Korea)
Blossom - Kim Jin-do (Korea)
Eyelids - O Muel (Korea)
Girl on the Edge (aka School Girl) - Park Geun-buem (Korea)
Overman - Seo Eun-young (Korea)
Recording - Park Min-kook (Korea)
Steel Flower - Park Suk-young (Korea)
The Battle of Gwangju - Lee Ji-sang (Korea)
The Boys Who Cried Wolf - Kim Jin-hwang (Korea)

Korean Cinema Retrospective

Hidden Masterpieces of the 1960s 
A Bloodthirsty Killer - Lee Yong-min (Korea)
The Body Confession - Jo Keung-ha (Korea)
The Cash Is Mine - Lee Sang-eon (Korea)
The DMZ - Park Sang-ho (Korea)
The Door of the Body - Lee Bong-rae (Korea)
The General's Mustache - Lee Sung-gu (Korea)
Trees Stand on Slope - Choi Ha-won (Korea)
When Night Falls at Myeongdong - Lee Hyung-pyo (Korea)

World Cinema 
11 Minutes - Jerzy Skolimowski (Poland/Ireland)
Aferim! - Radu Jude (Romania/Bulgaria/Czech Republic)
Anna - Charles-Olivier Michaud (Canada)
Arabian Nights Volume 1 - Miguel Gomes (Portugal/France/Germany/Switzerland)
Arabian Nights Volume 2 - Miguel Gomes (Portugal/France/Germany/Switzerland)
Arabian Nights Volume 3 - Miguel Gomes (Portugal/France/Germany/Switzerland)
Blood of My Blood - Marco Bellocchio (Italy/France/Switzerland)
Body - Małgorzata Szumowska (Poland)
Chronic - Michel Franco (Mexico)
Dheepan - Jacques Audiard (France)
Embrace of the Serpent - Ciro Guerra (Colombia)
Freeheld - Peter Sollett (United States)
In the Shadow of Women - Philippe Garrel (France/Switzerland)
Into the Forest - Patricia Rozema (Canada)
Jailbirds - Audrey Estrougo (France)
King of Life - Jerzy Zieliński (Poland)
Last Cab To Darwin - Jeremy Sims (Australia)
Louder Than Bombs - Joachim Trier (Norway/France/Denmark)
Ma Ma - Julio Medem (Spain/France)
My Golden Days - Arnaud Desplechin (France)
Paulina - Santiago Mitre (Argentina/Brazil/France)
Regression - Alejandro Amenábar (Spain/Canada)
Sicario - Denis Villeneuve (United States)
Sleeping Giant - Andrew Cividino (Canada)
Son of Saul - László Nemes (Hungary)
Summertime - Catherine Corsini (France)
Tale of Tales - Matteo Garrone (Italy/France)
Tangerine - Sean S. Baker (United States)
Tess - Roman Polanski (France/United Kingdom)
The 33 - Patricia Riggen (United States)
The Apostate - Federico Veiroj (Spain/France/Uruguay)
The Brand New Testament - Jaco Van Dormael (Belgium/France/Luxembourg)
The Companion - Pavel Giroud (Cuba/Colombia/France/Panama/Venezuela)
Braqueurs - Julien Leclercq (France)
The Daughter - Simon Stone (Australia)
The Dressmaker - Jocelyn Moorhouse (Australia)
The Endless River - Oliver Hermanus (South Africa/France)
The Final Lesson - Pascale Pouzadoux (France)
The High Sun - Dalibor Matanić (Croatia/Slovenia/Serbia)
The Kind Words - Shemi Zarhin - (Israel/Canada)
The Lobster - Yorgos Lanthimos (United Kingdom/Greece/Ireland)
The Measure of a Man - Stéphane Brizé (France)
The People vs. Fritz Bauer - Lars Kraume (Germany)
The Sweet Escape - Bruno Podalydès (France)
The Very Private Life of Mister Sim - Michel Leclerc (France)
The Weather Inside - Isabelle Stever (Germany)
Truman - Cesc Gay (Spain)
Urban Hymn - Michael Caton-Jones (United Kingdom)
Viva - Paddy Breathnach (Ireland)
Winter Song - Otar Iosseliani (France/Georgia)
Youth - Paolo Sorrentino (Italy)

Flash Forward 
As I Open My Eyes - Leyla Bouzid (France/Tunisia/Belgium/United Arab Emirates)
Babai - Visar Morina (Germany/Kosovo/Macedonia/France)
Banat - Adriano Valerio (Italy/Bulgaria/Macedonia/Romania)
Chicken - Joe Stephenson (United Kingdom)
Clever - Federico Borgia, Guillermo Madeiro (Uruguay)
Closet Monster - Stephen Dunn (Canada)
Eye of the Storm - Sékou Traoré (France/Burkina Faso)
Flocking - Beata Gårdeler (Sweden)
Frenzy - Emin Alper (Turkey/France/Qatar)
Highway to Hellas - Aron Lehmann - (Germany)
Home Care - Slávek Horák (Czech Republic/Slovak Republic)
Ixcanul - Jayro Bustamante (Guatemala/France)
Krisha - Trey Edward Shults (United States)
Lamb - Yared Zeleke (Ethiopia/France/Germany)
Land and Shade - César Augusto Acevedo (Colombia/France/Spain)
Les Cowboys - Thomas Bidegain (France)
Long Live the Bride - Ascanio Celestini (Italy/France)
Looking for Her - Ounie Lecomte (France)
Mustang - Deniz Gamze Ergüven (France/Germany/Turkey/Qatar)
Panama - Pavle Vučković (Serbia)
Parasol - Valéry Rosier (Belgium)
Raging Rose - Julia Kowalski (France/Poland)
Rams - Grímur Hákonarson (Iceland/Denmark)
Road to La Paz - Francisco Varone (Argentina/Netherlands/Germany/Qatar)
The Automatic Hate - Justin Lerner (United States)
The Devout - Connor Gaston (Canada)
The Exile - Arturo Ruiz Serrano (Spain)
The Project of the Century - Carlos Quintela (Argentina/Cuba/Germany/Switzerland)
The Summer of Sangailė - Alantė Kavaitė (Lithuania/France/Netherlands)
The Thin Yellow Line - Celso R. García (Mexico)

Wide Angle

Korean Short Film Competition 
A Place Left Behind - Moon Ji-won (Korea)
Anna - Je Jung-mo (Korea)
Bargain - Lee Chung-hyun (Korea)
Boy with Guitar - Kwon Hyo (Korea)
DESK - Kim You-June (Korea)
Dishonor - Kim Ui-suk (Korea)
Family - Chong Seung-hyun (Korea)
Shame Diary - Lee Eun-jeong (Korea)
The Chicken of Wuzuh - Byun Sung-bin (Korea)
The Transfer Student - Park Ji-in (Korea)

Asian Short Film Competition 
For We Are Strangers - Nicole Midori Woodford (Singapore)
Hpakant Jade Life - Lee Yong Chao (Taiwan)
Nia's Door - Lau Kek Huat (Taiwan)
Octopus - Jaypee Hamoc Jr. (Philippines)
Opus - Sugita Satoru (Japan)
Rapture - Nima Farahi (Iran)
Spring Awakening - Cheng Ya-Chih (Taiwan)
The Shame - Sushan Prajapati (Nepal)
Three Wheels - Neang Kavich (Cambodia/France)
Time to Die - Wang Tong (China)

Short Film Showcase 
Ave Maria - Basil Khalil (Palestine/France/Germany)
Color of Asia - Newcomers - Asmita Shrish, Fateme Ahmadi, Phuttiphong Aroonpheng, Cheng Liang, Lee Han-jong (China/Korea/Nepal/Thailand)
Dancing Cat - Min Yong-keun (Korea)
Durga - Vivek Kajaria (India)
Junilyn Has - Carlo Francisco Manatad (Philippines)
Life on the Border - Hazem Khodeide, Zohur Saeid, Basmeh Soleiman, Delovan Kekha, Diar Omar, Mahmod Ahmad, Rounahi Ezaddin, Sami Hossein (Syria/Iraq)
Love Story Not - Yosep Anggi Noen (Indonesia)
RED EYE - Yoon Eun-hye - (Korea)
The Audition - Martin Scorsese (United States)
The Best Director - Moon So-ri (Korea)
Where Mermaids Go - Kim Tae-yong (Korea)
William Wilson - Emmanuel Ollivier (France)

Documentary Competition 
Boys Run - Kang Seok-pil (Korea)
Fireflies in the Abyss - Chandrasekhar Reddy (India/United Kingdom)
Look Love - Ye Yun (China)
Reach For The SKY - Choi Woo-young, Steven Dhoedt (Korea/Belgium)
Shahrzaad's Tale - Shahin Parhami (Iran/Canada/Korea)
Still and All - Kim Young-jo (Korea)
Twenty Two - Guo Ke (China/Korea)
We Shall Overcome - Mikami Chie (Japan)
Where am I?: Beyond Girl and Woman - Kim Hyo-jung (Korea)
Zen and Bones - Nakamura Takayuki (Japan)

Documentary Showcase 
A Young Patriot - Du Haibin (China/France/United States)
Ashes to Ashes - Shin Sang-hoon (Korea)
Beyond My Grandfather Allende - Marcia Tambutti Allende (Chile/Mexico)
Drifting City - Kim Jeong (Korea)
Francofonia - Alexander Sokurov (France/Germany/Netherlands)
Grozny Blues - Nicola Bellucci - (Switzerland)
Hong Kong Trilogy: Preschooled Preoccupied Preposterous - Christopher Doyle (Hong Kong, China)
Horizon - Friðrik Þór Friðriksson, Bergur Bernburg (Iceland/Denmark)
Ice and the Sky - Luc Jacquet (France)
In Jackson Heights - Frederick Wiseman (United States)
Jai Ho - Umesh Aggarwal (India)
Jia Zhangke, a Guy from Fenyang - Walter Salles (Brazil)
My Land - Fan Jian (China)
Special Annie - Kim Hyun-kyung (Korea/United States)
The Dream of Shahrazad - François Verster (South Africa/Egypt/France/Netherlands/Jordan)
The Master - Nawapol Thamrongrattanarit (Thailand)
The Other Side - Roberto Minervini (Italy/France)
The Pearl Button - Patricio Guzmán (Chile/France/Spain)
Twinsters - Samantha Futerman, Ryan Miyamoto (United States/Korea/United Kingdom)

Cinekids 
Boonie Bears: Mystical Winter - Leon Ding (China)
Dumbo - Ben Sharpsteen (United States)
Rainbow - Nagesh Kukunoor (India)
Raven the Little Rascal - The Big Race - Sandor Jesse, Ute von Münchow-Pohl (Germany)
The Incredible Story of the Stone Boy - Miguel Uriegas, Miguel Bonilla, Jaime Romandía, Pablo Aldrete (Mexico)
Trenk, the Little Knight - Anthony Power (Germany/Austria)

Animation Showcase 
Adama - Simon Rouby (France)
Cafard - Jan Bultheel (Belgium/France/Netherlands)
Long Way North - Rémi Chayé (France/Denmark)
Only Yesterday - Isao Takahata (Japan)
The Magic Mountain - Anca Damian (Romania/Poland/France)

Open Cinema 
Baahubali: The Beginning - S. S. Rajamouli - (India)
Brother Bajrangi - Kabir Khan - (India)
Collective Invention - Kwon Oh-kwang - (Korea)
Courted - Christian Vincent - (France)
Monster Hunt - Raman Hui - (Hong Kong, China)
My Neighbor Totoro - Hayao Miyazaki - (Japan)
Our Times - Frankie Chen - (Taiwan)
The Wait - Piero Messina - (Italy)

Special Programs in Focus

Asian Cinema 100 
A Brighter Summer Day - Edward Yang (Taiwan)
A City of Sadness - Hou Hsiao-hsien (Taiwan)
Pather Panchali - Satyajit Ray (India)
Close-Up - Abbas Kiarostami (Iran)
Rashomon - Akira Kurosawa (Japan)
Seven Samurai - Akira Kurosawa (Japan)
Spring in a Small Town - Fei Mu (China)
Still Life - Jia Zhangke (China)
The Housemaid - Kim Ki-young (Korea )
Tokyo Story - Yasujirō Ozu (Japan)

(For the top 100 Asian films of all time, see Asian Cinema 100 Ranking)

My French Cinema 
A Man and a Woman - Claude Lelouch (France)
A Prophet - Jacques Audiard (France)
A Room in Town - Jacques Demy (France)
Bad Blood - Leos Carax (France)
Bellamy - Claude Chabrol (France)
Holy Motors - Leos Carax (France)
Just for Laughs - Lucas Belvaux (France)
Marianne of My Youth - Julien Duvivier (France)
My Sex Life... or How I Got into an Argument - Arnaud Desplechin (France)
Summer Hours - Olivier Assayas (France)

Midnight Passion 
Backtrack - Michael Petroni (United Kingdom/Australia)
Convergence - Drew Hall (United States)
Ghost Theater - Hideo Nakata (Japan)
Green Room - Jeremy Saulnier (United States)
Made in France - Nicolas Boukhrief (France)
Litchi Hikari Club - Eisuke Naito (Japan)
Numb - Jason R. Goode (Canada)
SPL II: A Time for Consequences - Cheang Pou-soi (Hong Kong, China/China)
Summer Camp - Alberto Marini (Spain/United States)
The Hallow - Corin Hardy (United Kingdom)
The Invitation - Karyn Kusama (United States)
The Visit - M. Night Shyamalan (United States )

Closing 
Mountain Cry - Larry Yang (China/United States)

Awards
New Currents Award
Immortal - Seyed Hadi Mohaghegh (Iran)
Walnut Tree - Yerlan Nurmukhambetov (Kazakhstan)
BIFF Mecenat Award
Boys Run - Kang Seok-pil (Korea)
Look Love - Ye Yun (China) 
Special Mention: Still and All - Kim Young-jo (Korea) 
Sonje Award
Shame Diary - Lee Eun-jeong (Korea) 
Nia's Door - Lau Kek Huat (Taiwan) 
Actor & Actress of the Year Award
Lee Ju-won - ALONE (Korea)
Sun Jang - Communication & Lies (Korea)
FIPRESCI Award
Immortal - Seyed Hadi Mohaghegh (Iran)
NETPAC Award
Communication & Lies - Lee Seung-won (Korea)
Daemyung Culture Wave Award 
Overman - Seo Eun-young (Korea)
KNN Award
Radio Set - Hari Viswanath (India)
Busan Bank Award
Highway to Hellas - Aron Lehmann (Germany)
Citizen Critics’ Award
ALONE - Park Hong-min (Korea)
Busan Cinephile Award
The Other Side - Roberto Minervini (Italy/France)
CGV Arthouse Award
Eyelids - O Muel (Korea)
DGK Award
The Boys Who Cried Wolf - Kim Jin-hwang (Korea)
Eyelids - O Muel (Korea)
The Asian Filmmaker of the Year
Studio Ghibli (Japan)
Korean Cinema Award
Wieland Speck (German)

Asian Cinema 100 
Asian Cinema 100 ranks top 100 Asian films of all time and it was completed with the help from directors, critics, film scholars, and journalists from various countries. 73 film professionals participated in the project with a total of 113 films (including joint rankings) and 106 directors listed in the "Asian Cinema Directors 100". It will be updated every 5 years and is expected to focus more attention and studies on Asian films.

Asian Cinema 100 Ranking

Asian Cinema Directors 100 Ranking

References

External links 
 

Busan International Film Festival
Busan International Film Festival
2015 in South Korea
Busan International Film Festival
2015 festivals in South Korea